Tuhár is a village and municipality in the Lučenec District in the Banská Bystrica Region of Slovakia. In Tuhár one can observe rare archeological finds due to the villages history during the Bronze Age. As of January 1, 1993, this village has been an official part of the Slovak Republic. The current mayor is Bc. Peter Čeman who was elected for his third term during the municipal elections of 2018. The chief controller of the municipality is Mgr. Erika Kajbová who carries out various legal activities.

References

External links
 
 
http://www.statistics.sk/mosmis/eng/run.html

Villages and municipalities in Lučenec District